The muaythai tournaments at the 2022 World Games in Birmingham, Alabama, United States were held from 15 to 17 July 2022 at the Boutwell Memorial Auditorium.  Originally scheduled to take place in 2021, the Games were rescheduled for July 2022 as a result of the 2020 Summer Olympics postponement due to the COVID-19 pandemic. It was the second time of muaythai including in the World Games.

Competition format
The number of weight classes for men was reduced from 8 to 6, with the women's weight classes having a corresponding increase from 3 to 6. It was the first time that Muaythai event achieved full gender equality.

Men will contest matches in these six weight classes:
Featherweight (57 kg)
Light welterweight (63.5 kg)
Welterweight (67 kg)
Light middleweight (71 kg)
Light heavyweight (81 kg)
Heavyweight (91 kg)
Women will contest matches in these six weight classes:
Light flyweight (48 kg)
Flyweight (51 kg)
Bantamweight (54 kg)
Featherweight (57 kg)
Lightweight (60 kg)
Light welterweight (63.5 kg)

Qualification

A total of 96 athletes could qualify for muaythai at the 2022 World Games. Each National Olympic Committee could enter a maximum of 12 judokas (one in each division). Host nation United States has reserved a spot in each of all 12 events.

Competition schedule
All times are in local time (UTC−5), according to the official schedule correct as of July 2021. This schedule may be subject to change in due time.

Participating nations
The following National Olympic Committees earned spots to compete, with the number of athletes in parentheses. 96 athletes from 39 NOCs are expected to participate. United States was the only delegation to qualify the maximum number of entries (12 athletes total).

Medal table

Medalists

Men

Women

Notes

References

External links
 Results book

2022 World Games events
 
2021
2022 in Muay Thai
Muay Thai competitions in the United States